Phelister is a genus of clown beetles in the family Histeridae. There are more than 90 described species in Phelister.

Species
These 95 species belong to the genus Phelister:

 Phelister acoposternus Marseul, 1853
 Phelister aduncus Schmidt, 1893
 Phelister affinis J. E. LeConte, 1860
 Phelister alticola Schmidt, 1893
 Phelister amplistrius Schmidt, 1893
 Phelister atrolucens Casey
 Phelister balzanii Schmidt, 1889
 Phelister bipulvinatus Marseul, 1853
 Phelister bistriatus Hinton, 1935
 Phelister blairi Hinton, 1935
 Phelister bolivianus Bickhardt, 1920
 Phelister bovinus Marseul, 1853
 Phelister brevis Bickhardt, 1917
 Phelister brevistriatus Casey, 1916
 Phelister brevistrius Marseul, 1853
 Phelister bruchi Bickhardt, 1920
 Phelister canalis Lewis, 1888
 Phelister carinifrons Schmidt, 1893
 Phelister carinullus Hinton, 1935
 Phelister carnochani Casey
 Phelister chapadae Lewis, 1900
 Phelister chilicola Marseul, 1870
 Phelister colombiae Lewis, 1908
 Phelister completus Schmidt, 1893
 Phelister condor Mazur, 1988
 Phelister contractus Casey
 Phelister daugar Marseul, 1861
 Phelister degallieri Kanaar, 1997
 Phelister desbordesi Bickhardt, 1917
 Phelister egincola Marseul, 1889
 Phelister erraticus Marseul, 1887
 Phelister finitimus Bickhardt, 1918
 Phelister flectohumerale Wenzel & Dybas, 1941
 Phelister foveicollis Lewis, 1902
 Phelister fractistrius Lewis, 1908
 Phelister fulvulus Marseul, 1870
 Phelister gebieni Bickhardt, 1920
 Phelister geijskesi Kanaar, 1997
 Phelister globiformis Marseul, 1853
 Phelister gracilis Schmidt, 1889
 Phelister haemorrhous Marseul, 1853
 Phelister hamistrius Schmidt, 1893
 Phelister interpunctatus Kirsch, 1866
 Phelister interrogans Marseul, 1889
 Phelister interruptus Hinton, 1935
 Phelister latus Wenzel & Dybas, 1941
 Phelister luculentus Bickhardt, 1917
 Phelister miramon Marseul, 1861
 Phelister mobilensis Casey, 1916
 Phelister mobiliensis
 Phelister muscicapa Marseul, 1870
 Phelister nanus Schmidt, 1889
 Phelister nidicola Bickhardt, 1920
 Phelister notandus Schmidt, 1893
 Phelister panamensis J. E. LeConte, 1860
 Phelister parallelisternus Schmidt, 1893
 Phelister petro Bickhardt, 1917
 Phelister praecox (Erichson, 1847)
 Phelister praedatorius Reichensperger, 1939
 Phelister pulvis Marseul, 1861
 Phelister pumilus (Erichson, 1834)
 Phelister puncticollis Hinton, 1935
 Phelister purgamenticolus Wenzel & Dybas, 1941
 Phelister pusillus Hinton, 1935
 Phelister pusio (Erichson, 1847)
 Phelister pusioides Marseul, 1861
 Phelister pygmaeus Bickhardt, 1918
 Phelister rectisternus Lewis, 1908
 Phelister rouzeti (Fairmaire, 1849)
 Phelister rubens Marseul, 1853
 Phelister rubicundus Marseul, 1889
 Phelister rufinotus Marseul, 1861
 Phelister ruptistrius Schmidt, 1893
 Phelister salobrus Marseul, 1887
 Phelister sanguinipennis Marseul, 1853
 Phelister sculpturatus Schmidt, 1893
 Phelister severus Bickhardt, 1917
 Phelister simplex Casey
 Phelister simus Marseul, 1861
 Phelister stercoricola Bickhardt, 1909
 Phelister striatinotus Wenzel & Dybas, 1941
 Phelister subgibbosus Hinton, 1935
 Phelister subrotundus (Say, 1825)
 Phelister testudo Lewis, 1908
 Phelister thiemei Schmidt, 1889
 Phelister tremolerasi Bickhardt, 1920
 Phelister trigonisternus Marseul, 1889
 Phelister tristriatus Hinton, 1935
 Phelister uncistrius Lewis, 1888
 Phelister venustus
 Phelister vernus (Say, 1825)
 Phelister vibius Marseul, 1861
 Phelister weberi Bickhardt, 1917
 Phelister wickhami Casey, 1916
 Phelister williamsi Wenzel & Dybas, 1941

References

Further reading

 
 
 

Histeridae
Articles created by Qbugbot